Alberta v Hutterian Brethren of Wilson Colony, 2009 SCC 37, [2009] 2 SCR 567 is a freedom of religion decision by the Supreme Court of Canada. The court addressed whether a requirement that all licensed drivers be photographed unconstitutionally violated the Hutterites' right to freedom of religion.

Background
The Hutterites believe that they cannot consent to being photographed. Previously, an exception had been made from the photograph requirement by the Alberta government. However, the government now keeps the photographs in a large database to prevent identity theft, and ended the exemption. Alberta claimed that making a constitutional exception for the Hutterites would undermine its attempts to prevent such fraud.

The Alberta Court of Appeal found for the Hutterites.

Opinion of the Court
The Alberta government conceded that this was a violation of the Hutterites' religious freedom protected under section 2 of the Canadian Charter of Rights and Freedoms, but argued this violation was allowable under section 1's "reasonable limits" on Charter rights. The Hutterites maintained that this was an unreasonable limit.

Chief Justice McLachlin, writing for the majority, found the law constitutional. She found that the government's need to fight fraud was pressing, and that driving was not a right, so the government was entitled to attach legitimate conditions to it.

Three justices dissented and would have not required the Hutterites to be photographed to be licensed. In three separate opinions, Justices Abella, LeBel and Fish found that this policy was not minimally impairing, since it would not significantly enable identity theft to allow the exceptions, and it would have a large detrimental effect on the Hutterites' way of life, since they would have to employ outsiders to perform all their necessary driving.

External links
 
Centre for Constitutional Studies: Alberta v. Hutterian Brethren of Wilson Colony (2009)

Section Two Charter case law
Canadian freedom of religion case law
Supreme Court of Canada cases
Hutterites in Canada
2009 in Canadian case law
Identity documents of Canada
Driving licences
Works about photography
Alberta litigation